Terp is music and dance industry jargon for "dance".

Etymology  
The term is an eponym for Terpsichore, the Greek muse of dramatic chorus and dance. The term, still in use, was more common from the 1930s to the 1970s by dance professionals and music entertainment industry magazines, including Billboard, which uses the terms "terp" and "terpsichore" (lower case "t"), interchangeably.

 Hackett's herd churns out a highly palatable brand of terp tempi, equally appealing to the ear and toe.
 I wrote 'Terpsichore in Sneakers' during the years 1973–78.
 [Reese LaRue]  known for torrid terpsichore; died Aug. 8, 1985.

References 

Musical terminology
English-language slang
Jazz terminology